The Hollywood Reel Independent Film Festival (commonly abbreviated as "HRIFF") is a film festival with a focus on independent films held annually at L.A. Live / Staples Center and additional cinemas across Hollywood, California. HRIFF guests have included Pierce Brosnan, Hilary Duff, Harry Dean Stanton, Martin Landau, Joe Mantegna, Josh Brener, Frances Fisher and Uwe Boll and many other Hollywood film celebrities.

Official HRIFF Award of Excellence Winners include Gérard Depardieu, Peter O'Toole, and Tinto Brass.  Other winners and/or attendees of note at HRIFF include Gary Cole, Ed Asner, Tyler Blackburn, Jon Polito, Danny Masterson, Laura Prepon, Mackenzie Phillips,  Rick Shapiro, John Heard, Grace Zabriskie, Jon Polito, Bruce Davison, John Robinson, Dominic Purcell, and Sharon Stone.

History 

The festival was established in 2001 with a focus on new independent films. It is a competitive event, annually screening films in competition and awarding the best films in its program in various categories during a red-carpet award show.

HRIFF has screened films produced by Ron Howard, Werner Herzog, Michael Apted, Errol Morris, and showcased films directed by Bryce Dallas Howard, Dusan Makavejev, and Bill Plympton, as well as films starring Jonathan Pryce, Zach Braff, Teri Polo, Clark Duke, Jonathan Banks, Lori Petty, Steven Weber, Jeremy Sisto, Dominique Swain, James Hong, Paul Rudd and more

Award of Excellence 
Each year, as part of its award show, the festival presents the "Award of Excellence" to multiple people whose work in film is considered highly influential, and whose work is shown in the festival.

In recent years recipients include:

 2011 - Gérard Depardieu "Award of Excellence" 
 2012 - Tinto Brass, "for innovations in cinematic language from his films in the 1960s and 1970s".
 2012 - Frances Fisher, "for exceptional contributions to the art of acting"
 2013 - Peter O'Toole, "for exceptional contributions to art of acting in a consistently distinguished career"
 2015 - Hugo Niebeling, for "artistic innovation".
 2016 - Harry Dean Stanton for "contributions to the art of acting" (and Mr Stanton sung "Danny Boy" while accepting his award at HRIFF in 2016).
 2017 - Warren Beatty, for "artistic innovation in cinema".

Notable films in competition 

 The Act of Killing, which received the "Best Picture" award at the 2013 HRIFF event was nominated for an Academy Award in 2014.
 2017 Academy Award winner Manchester By The Sea was screened at the Hollywood Reel Independent Film Festival.
 HRIFF 2015 Best Picture Force Majeure was later nominated for the Best Foreign Language Film at the 72nd Golden Globe Awards.
 Bridegroom, for which director Linda Bloodworth-Thomason won "Best Director" at HRIFF 2013, broke the record for the most highly funded film on Kickstarter in 2012.
 Dog It Down, which received the "Best Short Film" award at the 2012 event was executive produced by Kevin Connolly and aired on PBS to commemorate the 75th Anniversary of Pearl Harbor.

Retrospectives and special events 
 2012, the festival did a retrospective on the early, experimental films by Tinto Brass. It included the world premieres of restored versions of his 1969 film Nerosubianco, and Dropout and La Vacanza, two films from 1970 both starring Vanessa Redgrave and Franco Nero.
 2012, Uwe Boll premiered his film Bailout, also known as Assault on Wall Street at the festival, attending it in person together with principal cast members.
 2012, the festival premiered the newly restored HD version of Manos: The Hands of Fate. Cast-member Jackey Raye Neyman-Jones attended the event.
 2015, the festival does a retrospective of Hugo Niebeling's films.

Reception 
 LA Weekly added the 2012 festival on its weekly "Movie To-Do list".
 Tinto Brass: "I am very honored of receiving the award at ... Hollywood Reel Independent Film Festival, and it makes me really joyful."

References

External links 
 Official Website: Hollywood Reel Independent Film Festival
 Official Facebook-page of the festival

Film festivals in Los Angeles
Culture of Hollywood, Los Angeles